Sinantherina is a genus of rotifers belonging to the family Flosculariidae.

The genus has almost cosmopolitan distribution.

Species:

Sinantherina ariprepes 
Sinantherina procera 
Sinantherina semibullata 
Sinantherina socialis 
Sinantherina spinosa 
Sinantherina triglandularis

References

Rotifers